Back to God's Country is a 1919 Canadian drama film directed by David Hartford. It is one of the earliest Canadian feature films. The film starred and was co-written by Canadian actress Nell Shipman. With an estimated budget of over $67,000, it was the most successful silent film in Canadian history.

The film is noteworthy as it starred Shipman and was produced by her husband, Ernest. Shipman was one of the first women to do a nude scene on screen in the movie. In 1918, they created a production company, Shipman-Curwood Producing Company, to produce Back to God's Country. The film was the only film the company would produce, and was based on a short story, "Whapi, the Walrus", by James Oliver Curwood.

Curwood's story was adapted to the screen by Nell herself. She changed the protagonist of the film from a great dane to the female lead, Dolores. Shipman also shaped her character into a heroine, who saves her husband. Curwood was infuriated with Shipman, but commercially the film was extremely successful, posting a 300 percent profit and grossing a million-and-a-half dollars.

Cast

Preservation status 
It was later screened at the 1984 Festival of Festivals as part of Front & Centre, a special retrospective program of artistically and culturally significant films from throughout the history of Canadian cinema.

The film has been re-made twice by Hollywood, but the original version was believed to have been lost. However, a print of the original film was found in Europe, restored in 1985, and re-released. A copy of the film is in the Library of Congress film archive, and it has been released on DVD by Milestone Films.

See also
 List of rediscovered films

References

External links

 

Canadian silent feature films
Canadian black-and-white films
1919 films
1919 drama films
Canadian drama films
Films based on short fiction
Articles containing video clips
First National Pictures films
Northern (genre) films
1910s rediscovered films
Rediscovered Canadian films
Films based on works by James Oliver Curwood
1910s English-language films
1910s Canadian films
Silent drama films